Jo Jung-min is a South Korean singer, actress, pianist and singer-songwriter.

She debuted as a trot singer in 2009, releasing the regular album  Jeom Jeom Jeom under the stage name 'Joah', but stopped working after six months. Later, she resumed her career as a trot singer, returning to the music industry in 2014 under her real name, Jo Jung-min. Since 2018, she has been singing enka and more in Japan. As of 2022, she is often on stage singing while playing her piano, which is her own major, and she is also working on arranging songs that mix trot and other genres. She also works as a film and musical actress, as well as a magazine and advertising model. She became interested in trot after being attracted by singer Jang Yoon-jeong()'s songs, and fell in love with singer-songwriter Sim Soo-bong singing trot while playing the piano. And she says she wants to become 'the Beethoven of the trot world'.

Debut 
On September 8, 2009, under the stage name 'Joah'(), she released her regular album 《Jeom Jeom Jeom》(), and debuted as a trot singer. She took a hiatus after six months, but returned in 2014, operating under her real name, Jo Jung-min. She officially debuted on December 10, 2014, with the release of the EP 《Be My Love》.

Albums  
List of albums:

Regular 
 2009.09.08. Joah's 1st album 《Jeom Jeom Jeom》() Tracks 〈Chinatown〉(), 〈Jeom Jeom Jeom〉, 〈Telephone〉(), 〈What to do〉()

Single, EP 
 2014.12.10. EP 《Be My Love》 Tracks 〈Gomtangi〉(),〈Song of the day〉(),〈Gomtangi (Polka Ver.)〉
 2015.05.27. Single 《Jo Jeong-Min Digital Single (Sway)》 Tracks 〈SallangSallang〉(), 〈SallangSallang (Nu Jazz Ver.)〉
 2016.02.17. EP 《Superman》 Tracks 〈Superman〉, 〈Woman Like That〉(), 〈One Star, Two Stars〉()
 2018.07.20. EP 《Did You Eat》() tracks 〈Did You Eat〉, 〈Andante〉, 〈Did You Eat (Piano Ver.)〉
 2019.04.24. EP 《Drama》 Tracks 〈Ready Q〉, 〈Chaola (Holy night)〉(), 〈Kiss me〉, 〈Goodbye〉, 〈Love flower〉()
 2020.08.19. Single <Be Mine>() track <Be Mine>
 2021.11.23. Single 《Longer Stay》() Jo Jung-min X Ark(), track 〈Longer Stay〉
 2022.01.27. Single 《Don't Grab Your Ankle》() track 〈Don't Grab Your Ankle〉
 2022.11.03. Single 《Parallel Line》() track 〈Parallel Line〉
 2022.12.26. EP 《End, And》 tracks 〈Why go〉(), 〈Letter that can't be sent〉(), 〈Love that was not there〉()

Original Soundtrack 
 2016.04.30. 《Gahwamansaseong OST Part.5》() track 〈A Bittersweet Life〉()
 2016.08.13. 《Gahwamansaseong OST》()  track 〈A Bittersweet Life〉()

Compilation 
 2015.02.28. 《Immortal Songs - Singing the Legend (Kim Soo-hee Edition)》() track <Station>
 2015.04.18. 《Immortal Songs - Singing the Legend (Park Seong-hoon & Park Hyun-jin Episode 2)”()〈Love must be a butterfly〉
 2015.09.12. 《Immortal Songs - Singing the Legend (Joo Young-Hoon Episode 1)》() B-side song 〈Festival〉
 2015.12.20. 《King of Mask Singer]] Episode 38》() B-side song 〈Don't Leave Me (Rudolph Eight Heads)〉()
 2020.02.06. 《I am a trot singer Part1》() track 〈Seoul Tango〉()
 2020.02.13. 《I am a trot singer Part2》() B-side song 〈Million Roses〉()
 2020.08.08. 《Immortal Songs – Singing the Legend (Lyricist Kim Eana)》() B-side song 〈Abracadabra〉
 2020.10.16. 《Call Center of Love PART27》() track 〈Singing and Dancing〉()
 2020.10.17. 《Immortal Songs – Singing the Legend (Trot Men and Women Competition Special)》() track 〈I hate you〉()
 2020.11.28. 《Immortal Songs - Trot National Sports Festival Special Part 2”() track 〈Amor Party〉()
 2021.04.17. 《Immortal Songs - Trot National Sports Festival Coach Player Competition Part 1》() Track 〈10 MINUTES〉

Television 
 2014. MBC 《Song's World》() Guest
 2015. ~ KBS 1TV 《Golden Oldies》() Guest Singer
 2015 / 2020 MBC 《Mystery Music Show King of Mask Singer》(), 8-headed Rudolph / I hope you believe in me ~ / I'm your Singer S.E.S
 2016. JTBC 《Knowing Bros》(), Chuseok Special Episodes 41~42
 2017. ~ 《National TOP 10 Song Show]]》() Guest Singer
 2018. MBC sports+ 《7 out of 8 queue season 1》(), fixed guest
 2018. MBC sports+ 《7 out of 8 queue season 2》(), fixed guest
 2018. ~ MBC 《Best Songs》() 564th Jinju Part 1 
 2019. Screen Golf Zone TV 《Hey! Jung-min? Play Golf》(), Main MC
 2019. OBS Gyeongin Broadcasting 《Music Tank》(), main MC, military consolation performance
 2019. ~ 2021. MBC Chungbuk 《The Trot》(), Main MC
 2020. KBS 2TV 《New Release Side-Restaurant》(), fixed appearance from episode 29
 2020. TV Chosun 《I will sing the requested song - Call Center of Love》() Episode 27, Guest
 2020. KBS 2TV 《Immortal Song - Singing the Legend》(()) Guest
 2021. ~ SBS F!L, MTV 《The Trot Show》() Guest Singer

Radio 
 2022. TBS 《Choi Il-gu's Hurricane Radio》() 'Dessert Show After Lunch - I'm a Singer', Guest
 2022.02.07. ~ 05.24. TBS 《Choi Il-goo's Hurricane Radio》() 'Guests come, come, SHOW!'(()), fixed guest
 2022. TBN Gyeongin Traffic Broadcasting 《TBN Cha Cha Cha》(), Guest

Drama 
 2015 web drama 《Beginning of the Beginning》(), Role as Yoonhee()
 2016 web drama 《Beauty Salon M》(), role of Miji()
 2017 web drama 《Beauty Salon M - Mask》(), role of Jinee()

Film 
 2020 《Yoga Academy: Kundalini of Death》(()), role Miyeon()

Musical 
 2022.05.13. ~ 2022.08.07. 《Volume Up》() (Seoul Forest Galleria Foret), as Jeong Chae-eun()
 2022.09.02. ~ 2023.01.08. 《Volume Up》() (Seoul Forest Theater 1)

Model 
 2019. Cover model for the January issue of the men's magazine 《MAXIM》()
 2021. Danish brand 《Mateus》() main model
 2022. Egg Pay Co., Ltd. 《Caddy Pay》() PR model

MC, DJ 
 2021. MBC Chungbuk 《The Trot》() Main MC

Awards 
 2015. 《23rd Korea Culture and Entertainment Awards》() Adult song category, Rookie Award
 2016. 《Proud Koreans Who Shine Korea Grand Prize》() Grand prize for the most popular live singer selected by the reporter
 2016. 《MBC Gayo Best Grand Festival》() Rookie Award
 2017. 《Best Song Show Grand Festival》() Rookie Award
 2017. 《2017 Korea Proud Korean Grand Prize》() Rookie Award
 2018. 《Gayo TV Music Awards》() Runner-up Singer Award
 2018. 《The 8th Korea Hallyu Grand Prize》() Overseas Rising Star Award
 2019. 《The 7th Korea Marketing Grand Prize》() Tomorrow's Star Award
 2019. 《Popket Asia Music Awards》() Popularity Award

School 
 'Kaywon Arts High School' Graduated from Department of Music (Piano Major)
 Kookmin University Bachelor of Arts, Department of Music (Piano Major)

Other activities 
 2022.05.26. 《Korea Coast Guard Public Relations》 Ambassador
 2022.06.29. 《Korea Army Association Public Relations》 Ambassador
 2022.11.11. 《The 43rd Seoul Dance Festival》 Ambassador

References

External links 
 Official website
 Blog

1986 births
Living people
People from Seoul
21st-century South Korean women singers
Trot singers
Korean singers
South Korean women singer-songwriters
South Korean Protestants
Kookmin University alumni